New Zealand is a country in the southwestern Pacific Ocean.

New Zealand may also refer to:

Places
 The Realm of New Zealand, comprising Cook Islands, New Zealand, Niue, Tokelau and Ross Dependency
 The Dominion of New Zealand, the former name of the Realm of New Zealand
 FELDA New Zealand, Pahang, Malaysia
 New Zealand, Buckinghamshire, England
 New Zealand, Derby, a suburb of Derby, England
 New Zealand, Wiltshire, England
 Essequibo (colony), a former Dutch and British colony on modern Guyana's Essequibo River, originally known as Nova Zeelandia ("New Zeeland")
 The English translation of the short-lived Danish colony of Ny Sjælland ("New Zealand") on the island of Nancowry in the Indian Ocean

Ships
 New Zealand, a sailing ship chartered by the New Zealand Company in 1842
 HMS New Zealand (1904), a British battleship later renamed Zealandia
 HMS New Zealand (1911), a British battlecruiser
 SS New Zealand Victory (1944), an American merchant marine naval cargo ship

Other
 45570 New Zealand, a British LMS Jubilee Class locomotive
 The NewZealand Story, a 1988 arcade game
 New Zealand, codename for the Radeon HD 7990 video card, part of the Radeon HD 7000 Series

See also
Zealand (disambiguation)
Lew Zealand from The Muppets